Mirza Ali Kandi (also Romanized as Mīrzā ‘Alī Kandī; also known as Marzā ‘Alī Kandī, Merzā ‘Alī Kandī, Mizārli Kand, Mizārli Kandi, and Mizarli-Kendy) is a village in Ozomdel-e Jonubi Rural District, in the Central District of Varzaqan County, East Azerbaijan Province, Iran. At the 2006 census, its population was 271, in 57 families.

The village was damaged in the 2012 East Azerbaijan earthquakes.

References 

Towns and villages in Varzaqan County